The table below lists the reasons delivered from the bench by the Supreme Court of Canada during 2004. The table illustrates what reasons were filed by each justice in each case, and which justices joined each reason. This list, however, does not include decisions on motions.

Of the 80 reasons released in 2004, 8 were oral reasons, 55 were unanimous, and 2 motions.

Reasons

Justices of the Supreme Court

Notes

External links
 2004 decisions: CanLII LexUM

Table key

Reasons Of The Supreme Court Of Canada, 2004
2004